Brandon Aguilera Zamora (born 28 June 2003) is a Costa Rican professional footballer who plays as a midfielder for Estoril, on loan from Premier League club Nottingham Forest, and the Costa Rica national team.

Career

Club
In July 2022 Premier League side Nottingham Forest announced they had signed Aguilera on a four-year deal from Alajuelense, and would immediately be loaned to fellow Costa Rican side Guanacasteca for six months. In January 2023, Aguilera joined Primeira Liga club Estoril on loan until the end of the season.

International
A youth international for Costa Rica since 2018, Aguilera made his senior team debut against the United States on 30 March 2022. In November 2022 he was named to the 26-man Costa Rica squad for the 2022 FIFA World Cup.

Career statistics

Club

Notes

Honours
Alajuelense
 Liga FPD: Apertura 2020
 CONCACAF League: 2020

References

2003 births
Living people
People from Grecia (canton)
Costa Rican men's footballers
Costa Rica youth international footballers
Association football midfielders
A.D. Carmelita footballers
L.D. Alajuelense footballers
Nottingham Forest F.C. players
G.D. Estoril Praia players
Liga FPD players
2022 FIFA World Cup players
Costa Rican expatriate footballers
Expatriate footballers in England
Costa Rican expatriate sportspeople in England
Expatriate footballers in Portugal
Costa Rican expatriate sportspeople in Portugal